Liolaemus schroederi (Schroeder's tree iguana) is a species of lizard in the family Iguanidae. The species is endemic to Chile, with endemic occurrence noted in the Chilean matorral.

Etymology
The specific name, schroederi, is in honor of American ichthyologist William Charles Schroeder.

References

Sources
Hogan, C. Michael, & World Wildlife Fund (2013). Chilean matorral. ed. M.McGinley. Encyclopedia of Earth. National Council for Science and the Environment. Washington DC
World Conservation Monitoring Centre (1996). IUCN Red List of Threatened Species. 
Müller, L. (1938). "Beiträge zur Kenntnis der Herpetofauna Chiles. XI. Über zwei neue Liolaemus-formen aus der chilenischen Kordillere (Sammlung Schröder) ". Zoologischer Anzeiger 122: 225–237. (Liolaemus schroederi, new species). (in German).

schroederi
Lizards of South America
Endemic fauna of Chile
Reptiles of Chile
Chilean Matorral
Reptiles described in 1938